Godfrey Denis Armel (born August 16, 1985) is a Seychellois football player. He is a central back defender on the Seychelles national football team.

External links

1985 births
Living people
Seychellois footballers
Seychelles international footballers
Place of birth missing (living people)
Association football defenders
21st-century Seychellois people